The LT-1 is a Chevrolet small-block engine produced by the Chevrolet Division of General Motors between 1970 and 1972. It was available exclusively in the Corvette and Camaro and was produced in relatively small quantities. It is regarded today as one of the greatest of the Chevy small-blocks, an engine that has been in production since 1955.

History
Chevrolet introduced the  LT-1 in 1970, making it available in both the Corvette and Camaro. It was an optional engine in the Corvette, and available and as part of the high-performance ZR-1 option. Between 1970 and 1972 only 53 ZRs were produced, making it one of the rarest Corvettes. In the Camaro, the engine was available only through the high performance Z/28 option, replacing the  engine designed to compete in Trans Am racing's  class installed in 1967-1969 cars.

The LT-1 had an 11.0:1 compression ratio, Holley  4-barrel carburetor, and solid lifters. Despite the disparity between the two cars' listed hp there was no difference between the engines.

Gross horsepower was not given in 1972.

In 1970 a Nova could also be ordered with an LT-1 via a Central Office Production Order (COPO). Fifty of these were ordered by Don Yenko at Yenko Chevrolet and were converted into Yenko Deuces. Yenko also converted another 125 L65 Novas into LT-1 Deuces.

Production numbers

 * 25 of these were ordered with RPO ZR1.
 ** 8 of these were ordered with RPO ZR1.
 *** 20 of these were ordered with RPO ZR1.
 **** 50 of these were converted into Yenko Deuces.

1990s "LT1"
In 1992 General Motors introduced the LT1, a high-performance  engine based on the Chevy small block V8 and named as a tribute to the original LT-1. It was offered as a base engine on the C4 Corvette and a variety of other GM vehicles in several states of tune through 1997, including the Camaro Z/28, performance-package Pontiac Firebirds, police interceptors, a number of large luxury cars, and a luxury station wagon.

References
Holdener, Richard. "1970 GM 350 Small-Block Engine - Clash of the Small Block Titans." In Super Chevy Online. 8 June 2010. http://www.superchevy.com/how-to/vemp-1008-1970-gm-350-small-block-engine/.
Koch, Jeff. "COPO Gigio - 1970 Chevrolet Nova." In Hemmings Muscle Machines. June 2005.
Mattar, George. "1970 Corvette LT-1: Best small-block ever?" In Hemmings Motor News. December 2007.

Chevrolet engines
V8 engines
Gasoline engines by model